Rachel Cruze (née Ramsey; born April 25, 1988) is an American author who specializes on the subject of personal finance. Her book Smart Money Smart Kids, co-authored with her father, Dave Ramsey, reached number one on The New York Times Best Seller list in 2014. Her second book Love Your Life, Not Theirs: 7 Money Habits for Living the Life You Want was published in 2016.

Early life and education 
Cruze was born and raised in Tennessee, one of three children born to author and radio host Dave Ramsey and his wife, Sharon Ramsey. She was raised in an Evangelical Christian household. Cruze attended Brentwood High School and earned a Bachelor of Arts degree in communications from the University of Tennessee.

Career 
Cruze has been cited  on how to save for purchasing a home. She advocates using debit cards instead of credit cards as a way to control spending, and to never spend beyond one's means, which "requires a discipline and a mindset that often goes against the grain of our instantly gratified society," she said in an interview in the Kansas City Star.

Cruze has appeared on Good Day L.A..

Works 
Smart Money Smart Kids (co-authored with her father Dave Ramsey)
Love Your Life, Not Theirs: 7 Money Habits for Living the Life You Want 
The Graduate's Survival Guide (co-author)
The Contentment Journal
Know Yourself, Know Your Money

References

External links
 YouTube channel

1988 births
American business writers
Women business writers
American finance and investment writers
American financial literacy activists
Place of birth missing (living people)
American financial commentators
Living people
People from Nashville, Tennessee
Personal finance education
University of Tennessee alumni
Writers from Tennessee
21st-century American non-fiction writers
21st-century American women writers
American women non-fiction writers
Women business and financial journalists
Christians from Tennessee